Islampur Assembly constituency is one of the 288 constituencies of Maharashtra Legislative Assembly, in India. It came into existence when assembly seat boundaries were redrawn in 2008, and it includes much of the area which was under a seat named  Walva. It is a segment of Hatkanangle (Lok Sabha constituency). There is a vidhan sabha segment named Islampur in  West Bengal as well.

Members of Vidhan Sabha
 Before 2008 : Seat did not exist. See : Walva Assembly constituency
 2009:  Jayant Rajaram Patil, Nationalist Congress Party
 2014: Jayant Rajaram Patil, Nationalist Congress Party
 2019: Jayant Rajaram Patil, Nationalist Congress Party

Election Results

2009 Vidhan Sabha Elections
 Jayant Rajaram Patil (NCP) : 91,673 votes 
 Vaibhav Nagnath Naikawadi (IND) : 56,165

2014 Vidhan Sabha Elections
 Jayant Rajaram Patil (NCP) : 113,045 votes 
 Abhijit Patil (IND) : 37,859

See also
 Walva Assembly constituency
 List of constituencies of Maharashtra Legislative Assembly

References

Assembly constituencies of Maharashtra